The Harbour Lights is a 1914 British silent drama film directed by Percy Nash and starring Gerald Lawrence, Mercy Hatton and Daisy Cordell. It is an adaptation of the Victorian melodramatic play The Harbour Lights by George R. Sims.

Cast
 Gerald Lawrence - Lt David Kingsley
 Mercy Hatton - Dora Vane
 Daisy Cordell - Lina Nelson
 Fred Morgan - Nicholas Morland
 Gregory Scott - Frank Morland
 Douglas Payne - Mark Helstone
 Joan Ritz - Peggy Chudleigh
 John Marlborough East - Capt. Nelson
 May Lynn - Mrs. Helstone
 Brian Daly - Tom Dossiter
 Bryan Powley - Capt. Hardy
 Helen Lainsbury - Polly

References

External links

1914 films
British silent feature films
1914 drama films
1910s English-language films
Films directed by Percy Nash
British films based on plays
British drama films
British black-and-white films
1910s British films
Silent drama films